is an old province of Japan in the area of Miyagi Prefecture (excluding Igu, Katta District and Watari Districts) and parts of Iwate Prefecture (specifically Kesen District). It was sometimes called , with Rikuchū and Mutsu Provinces.

History
January 19, 1869: Rikuzen is separated from Mutsu Province
1872: A census estimates the population at 534,609

Historical districts
 Iwate Prefecture
 Kesen District (気仙郡)
 Miyagi Prefecture
 Kami District (加美郡)
 Kurihara District (栗原郡) - dissolved
 Kurokawa District (黒川郡)
 Miyagi District (宮城郡)
 Monou District (桃生郡) - dissolved
 Motoyoshi District (本吉郡)
 Natori District (名取郡) - dissolved
 Oshika District (牡鹿郡)
 Shibata District (柴田郡)
 Shida District (志田郡)- dissolved 
 Tamatsukuri District (玉造郡) - dissolved
 Tōda District (遠田郡)
 Tome District (登米郡) - dissolved

See also
 Sanriku
 List of Provinces of Japan

Notes

References
 Nussbaum, Louis-Frédéric and Käthe Roth. (2005).  Japan encyclopedia. Cambridge: Harvard University Press. ;  OCLC 58053128

Other websites

  Murdoch's map of provinces, 1903

Former provinces of Japan